The Turf Club is a music venue located on the west side of Asbury Park, New Jersey. It is the last remaining venue along Springwood Avenue, a once-thriving African American business and entertainment district.

Founding 
The Turf Club opened around 1940 at 1125 Springwood Avenue. Its original owners were Robert and Caroll Brown. Ownership was soon transferred to John Moore, who operated the club until 1947.

Leo Karp and Sol Konvitz owned and operated the club at its original location from 1948 to 1955. No records indicate that the club was used as a music venue before 1956.

Music venue 
In 1956, Leo Karp moved the club to 1200 Springwood Avenue and changed the name to "Leo's Turf Club". The venue presented musical acts including Illinois Jacquet and Clarence Clemons.

Ownership was transferred again to Waylon Goldston in January 1970. Goldston changed the club's name to "Wakie's Show Place". In July of the same year, businesses along Springwood Avenue were damaged or destroyed during the Asbury Park riots, a civil uprising during which Black youth in the area revolted against poor treatment, housing conditions, and an unemployment crisis. The club remained opened and continued to operate.

The club was purchased by Frederick Thorne in 1972 and was renamed "Turf Melody Lounge". It changed hands twice more, becoming “Mae’s Melody Lounge” and then the “Sports Turf Club.”

There was a fire at the club in the late 1990s, after which it changed hands a few more times, with one new owner planning to open a laundromat at the location.

Restoration efforts 
In 2020, the Asbury Park African-American Music Project (AP-AMP) announced plans to revitalize The Turf Club. The organization purchased the club in 2022 and, in the same year, received a grant from the National Trust for Historic Preservation's African American Cultural Heritage Action Fund to help cover rehabilitation expenses.

AP-AMP has hosted live music events at the club since 2021.

References

External links 
Asbury Park African American Music Project

Music venues in New Jersey
Asbury Park, New Jersey
Buildings and structures in Monmouth County, New Jersey
1940 establishments in New Jersey